Jalan Temenggor (Perak state route A171) is a major road in Perak, Malaysia. It connects Kuala Rui with Kampung Bendang Riang, Bersia, and Temenggor Dam.

List of junctions

Roads in Perak